A by-election was held for the New South Wales Legislative Assembly electorate of Newtown on 13 January 1883. The election was triggered by the appointment of Henry Copeland as Secretary for Public Works in the Stuart ministry.

George Reid comfortably retained his seat at the East Sydney by-election held the week before, while the six other ministers, Alexander Stuart (Illawarra), George Dibbs (St Leonards), Henry Cohen (West Maitland), James Farnell (New England), Francis Wright (Redfern) and Joseph Abbott (Gunnedah), were re-elected unopposed.

Dates

Results

				

Henry Copeland was appointed Secretary for Public Works in the Stuart ministry.

Aftermath
The next by-election was held the following week for East Sydney and Henry Copeland was comfortably elected.

See also
Electoral results for the district of Newtown
List of New South Wales state by-elections

References

1883 elections in Australia
New South Wales state by-elections
1880s in New South Wales